New Majority may refer to:

 New Majority (TV series), a Canadian current affairs television series
 Nueva Mayoría (New Majority) (Chile), a Chilean centre-left electoral coalition created in 2013
 New Majority (Slovakia), a conservative political party in Slovakia
 New Majority (Peru), a right-wing Peruvian political party
 New Majority (Monaco), a Monegasque centre-right coalition created in 2016
 The New Majority (book), book by Pat Buchanan